The Montrose Apartments is an historic building in Victoria, British Columbia, Canada.

See also
 List of historic places in Victoria, British Columbia

References

External links
 

1912 establishments in British Columbia
Buildings and structures in Victoria, British Columbia
Residential buildings completed in 1912